Chaotic Wrestling (CW) is an American independent wrestling promotion, which has been operating throughout New England since 2000; with its current home base in North Andover, Massachusetts.  

Chaotic Wrestling is known for producing successful, homegrown talent through their professional wrestling school, the New England Pro Wrestling Academy (formerly known as the Chaotic Training Center).  Graduates of the school include Sasha Banks, Kofi Kingston, Tommaso Ciampa, Oney Lorcan, Ivar (Viking Raiders), among others.

History
Originally Chaotic World Wrestling, the Chaotic Wrestling roster is composed mainly of independent wrestlers and established veterans from major wrestling promotions. Chaotic Wrestling has run events every two or three weeks since opening in 2000. Founded by Tom Davidson (aka The Missionary Man) and Joshua Opper (aka Kid Anarchy) two native Massachusetts residents who worked small independent outfits on the west coast most notably, Incredibly Strange Wrestling. In the promotion's first year of operation, Chaotic Wrestling was featured at New England's Locobazooka music festival. The wrestlers competed alongside musical acts such as Days of the New and Disturbed at the event, which was attended by an estimated 15,000 people.

Chaotic Wrestling has been described as a “feeder fed[eration]” for World Wrestling Entertainment (WWE). Because of this relationship, WWE has been known to contact CW when they are in need of people to appear on WWE programming. Chaotic Wrestling was selected in 2006 to host a large WWE tryout session, and several Chaotic Wrestling competitors, including Kofi Kingston, were later employed by WWE. Former Chaotic Wrestling referee and booker Todd Sinclair has also worked for WWE and currently works for Ring of Honor.

Chaotic Wrestling has also employed several wrestlers who had previously gained fame with major promotions. World Wrestling Entertainment Hall of Famer Tony Atlas has competed for the promotion. After his previous employer, Extreme Championship Wrestling, went out of business, Spike Dudley joined Chaotic Wrestling and held the tag team championship before signing with WWE. Other notable wrestlers that have appeared for Chaotic Wrestling include Brutus Beefcake, King Kong Bundy, and WWE Hall of Famers Bret Hart, Tito Santana, Jimmy Snuka, and Ricky Steamboat. Chaotic Wrestling has also participated in a talent exchange program with the East Coast Wrestling Association, an independent promotion that has been operating since 1967. This program allowed wrestlers from each promotion to compete in both CW and ECWA.

Some wrestlers competing for Chaotic Wrestling have been noted for their unusual gimmicks. Writing for The Boston Phoenix, columnist Sean Bartlett commented on the "baroque characters" and wrestlers wearing "vinyl boots and fluorescent hot pants". Boston Magazines Benoit Denizet-Lewis pointed to the "ambiguously gay" two-time Chaotic Wrestling Tag Team Champions One Night Stand (Ronnie D. Lishus & Edward G. Xtasy) as well as Arch Kincaid, a man resembling a "1980s porn star" who "lectures about existentialism and philosophical theory" at Chaotic Wrestling events, as an example of the promotion's appeal. In a story about the promotion for The Boston Globe, Danielle Dreilinger described how a referee searched a wrestler named Psycho for foreign objects prior to a match. The referee was forced to confiscate many weapons, including a hula hoop and a slice of pizza.

Chaotic Wrestling owner Jamie Jamitkowski states that the promotion has no desire to compete with Vince McMahon's World Wrestling Entertainment, preferring the "tight-knit community of wrestlers and fans". He views Chaotic Wrestling as an affordable alternative to major promotions and says that fans are able to feel more involved at independent wrestling shows. He also states that the promotion has benefited in some ways from the late-2000s recession, as more fans are attending independent shows run by independent promotions like CW rather than paying for more expensive tickets to attend WWE events. This increase in ticket sales has allowed Chaotic Wrestling to operate more shows and expand their market into new cities.

In May 2007, Chaotic Wrestling and Fabulous Productions announced a special charity event featuring then-World Wrestling Entertainment Champion John Cena acting as special guest referee between two of CW's wrestlers, Brian Milonas and "Big" Rick Fuller. Cena’s father, who works for Chaotic Wrestling as an announcer, was in Fuller’s corner.
During the match, WWE CEO Vince McMahon made a surprise appearance, attacking Cena, only to receive an FU from him. The event also featured WWE wrestler Eugene competing against Handsome Johnny. Funds from the event went to the Newbury Police Association and several other charities.

Chaotic Wrestling later hosted another fundraiser event to help with the medical bills for WWE Hall of Famer and former Chaotic Training Center operator Killer Kowalski.

Pro Wrestling Academy (NEPWA)
Chaotic Wrestling also operates a successful professional wrestling school known as the New England Pro Wrestling Academy (NEPWA), which operated as the Chaotic Training Center until July 1, 2011.  The school was established in the early 2000s, when it merged with the world renown Killer Kowalski School of Wrestling. Kowalski, who has been described as one of the “most respected trainers” in the world and trained such wrestlers as Big John Studd, Triple H, Perry Saturn, and Chyna, oversaw training at the school prior to his death.

The school is currently owned by Chaotic Wrestling owner, Kevin Bowe (Chase Del Monte), as well as Scott Guerin (Max Smashmaster) former Chikara star.  The school has also hosted many guests from the wrestling industry including John Cena, Triple H and Stephanie McMahon, The Rock and Goldberg, Tom Prichard, Tommy Dreamer, Percy Pringle, Nunzio, Charlie Haas and many others.

While forced to shut down for several months during the COVID-19 Pandemic, the school underwent numerous renovations to improve the facilities provided to their students.  Post-renovations, the school now is equipped with a full gym/workout area, as well as a "collapsible" studio, so that they can also utilize the facility to record full wrestling shows during the pandemic.

Notable graduates
Several graduates have appeared on WWE television, wrestled tryout matches, signed developmental contracts, or have appeared on TNA programming.
Kofi Kingston
Damien Sandow
Dominik Dijakovic
Flip Gordon
R. J. Brewer
Chad Wicks
Ivar
Sasha Banks
Darren Young
Roxxi
Kenny Dykstra
Oney Lorcan
Tommaso Ciampa

Championships

Current champions

Retired and defunct championships

Alumni

Aaron Stevens
Adam Barisano
Alex Arion
Ali Muhammad
Andre Lyonz
Angers
Anthony Greene
Antonio Thomas
April Hunter
Arch Kincaid
Austin Aries
Barbie
Bret Hart
Billy Bax
Billy Kryptonite
Brian Black
”Firebrand” Brian Fury
Brian Milonas
Brutus Beefcake
Charlie Haas
Cherry Payne
Chief Fox
Christopher Nowinski
Craig Stratton
"The Immortal" Dan Murphy
Dawn Marie
Dr. Reginald Heresy
East Coast Cowboy
Edward G. Xtasy
Flip Gordon
Fred "Bonecrusher" Sampson
Frankie Armadillo
Gino Martino
Jason Blade
"Thrillride" Jimmy Preston
Jimmy Snuka
John Cena
Johnny Fabulous
"Fabulous" Johnny Vegas
John Kronus
R. J. Brewer
"Butcher" Jon Poe
J. T. Franks
Julian Starr
Kenn Phoenix
King Kong Bundy
Kofi Nahaje Kingston
Little Guido Maritato
Low Ki
"Latin Fury" Luis (Demon) Ortiz
Mark Shurman
 Matt Bennett
Matt Taven
Matthew Evagrius
Maverick Wild
Max Bauer (wrestler)
Mercedes KV
"The American Sasuke" Mikaze
Mike Crockett
Mike Kruel
Mike Nice/MPG
"Hot Shot" Mike Reed
Nick Gamma
Nick Logan
Nikki Roxx
Nova
Peter Mulloy
Pristine Kristine
Psycho
Referee Richard Lannon
 "Big" Rick Fuller
Ricky Steamboat
Rob Eckos
Ronnie D. Lishus
"The Scene" Scott Reed
"Manager of Champions" Sean Gorman
Short Sleeve Sampson
Sledge
Simon Diamond
Slyck Wagner Brown
Sparkles
Spike Dudley
Stevie Richards
Studd
Tim McNeany
Tito Santana
Todd Sinclair
Tommaso Ciampa
Tommy Dreamer
Tony Atlas
Tony Omega
U-Gene
 Christopher Annino aka Rescue 911
Vince Vicallo
Xavier

Chaotic Wrestling Hall of Fame
The Chaotic Wrestling Hall of Fame is an American professional wrestling hall of fame maintained by the Lowell-based promotion Chaotic Wrestling (CW'). It was established in 2006 to honor wrestlers who have wrestled for the promotion.

Inductees

See also
List of independent wrestling promotions in the United States

References

External links
Official website
Chaotic Training Center

Independent professional wrestling promotions based in Massachusetts